Elsie Eleanore Wayne (née Fairweather; April 20, 1932 – August 23, 2016) was a Canadian politician who served as a Progressive Conservative Member of Parliament for Saint John from 1993 to 2004. She was born in Shediac, New Brunswick.

Political career

In 1977, she was elected to the Saint John municipal council. In 1983, she became the first female mayor of Saint John, and became extremely popular in that city.

In the 1993 federal election, she ran as the governing Progressive Conservative Party's candidate in the riding of Saint John. In this election, the Tories suffered the worst ever defeat for a governing party at the federal level in Canada. Wayne was one of only two Tories elected nationwide, the other being Jean Charest. She was also the only non-Liberal elected in Atlantic Canada that year. She was elected by 4,000 votes, but never faced another contest nearly that close.

In 1998, when Charest resigned the leadership of the PC party to become leader of the Quebec Liberal Party, Wayne was appointed the PC party's interim leader, a post she held until former Prime Minister Joe Clark was elected party leader later that year.

She supported the merger of the Progressive Conservatives (led by Peter MacKay) and the Canadian Alliance (led by Stephen Harper) in 2003.

Wayne announced her retirement from politics on February 16, 2004 and did not run for re-election in the 2004 election to the House of Commons of Canada.

Political positions

Politically, she was known as being socially conservative, vehemently opposing same-sex marriage. She was also against abortion rights, decriminalization of marijuana, and Viagra for war vets.

Fiscally, Wayne was a strong believer in Canada's social safety net and the welfare state, which was typical for most Tories from Atlantic Canada. She was also among Canada's most vocal monarchists.

Later life and death
Wayne considered a run for her old seat in the 2006 election, but decided against a comeback. She did, however, serve as chairwoman of the Conservative campaign in Atlantic Canada.

She was married to Richard Wayne and has two sons, Daniel and Stephen. In November 2009, she suffered a stroke. She was released from hospital in February 2010. She died on August 23, 2016 at her home in Saint John.

Electoral history

References

External links
 

1932 births
2016 deaths
Members of the House of Commons of Canada from New Brunswick
Progressive Conservative Party of Canada MPs
Conservative Party of Canada MPs
Canadian Baptists
Canadian monarchists
Women mayors of places in New Brunswick
Women members of the House of Commons of Canada
Female Canadian political party leaders
Mayors of Saint John, New Brunswick
People from Shediac
21st-century Canadian politicians
21st-century Canadian women politicians
20th-century Baptists